Gilwell may refer to:

Gilwell Park, a Scouting centre near London
Gilwell Campsite, a Scouting campsite in Hong Kong
Gilwell Park (Victoria), a Scouting campsite near Victoria, Australia
Camp Gilwell, a Scouting campsite near Saskatchewan, Canada
 Gilwell (1801 ship), a merchant ship

See also
Gilwell Ada's Hoeve, Scouting campsite in the Netherlands